Aleksei Leonidovich Latushkin (born 24 June 1972) is a former Russian professional football player.

Club career
He played in the Russian Football National League for FC Luch Vladivostok in 1997.

References

1972 births
Living people
Soviet footballers
Russian footballers
Association football utility players
FC Luch Vladivostok players
FC Okean Nakhodka players
FC Smena Komsomolsk-na-Amure players